Francisco Mascarenhas may refer to:

Francisco de Mascarenhas, Portuguese count from the 16th century
Francisco Mascarenhas (footballer), full name Francisco Fumaça de Mascarenhas da Costa Pessoa, Portuguese football forward